Take the Heir is a 1930 American comedy film directed by Lloyd Ingraham and starring Edward Everett Horton, Dorothy Devore and Edythe Chapman. It was produced during the transition to sound film and a separate silent version was also released. Location shooting took place around Broadway. A review in the Motion Picture News considered the film "very, very weak" and a waste of Everett Horton's talents.

Synopsis
An English aristocrat Lord Tweedham inherits property in the United States. However, when he arrives he is in such a drunken state that his valet Smithers is forced to impersonate him. At the house of the executor Smithers falls in love with Susan the maid while being pursued by his daughter Muriel under the impression that he is Tweedham.

Cast
 Edward Everett Horton as 	Smithers
 Dorothy Devore as 	Susan
 Frank Elliott as 	Lord Tweedham
 Edythe Chapman as Lady Tweedham
 Otis Harlan as 	John Walker
 Kay Deslys as 	Muriel Walker
 Margaret Campbell as 	Mrs. Smythe-Bellingham

References

Bibliography
 Pitts, Michael R. Poverty Row Studios, 1929–1940. McFarland & Company, 2005.

External links
 

1930 films
1930 comedy films
1930s English-language films
American comedy films
Films directed by Lloyd Ingraham
American black-and-white films
1930s American films